St Botolph's Review was the student-made poetry journal  from Cambridge University, England in  1956, which saw the first publication of Ted Hughes' poetry, at the  launch of which Hughes met Sylvia Plath. The first issue appeared on 26 February 1956.

It was named for St Botolph's Church, Cambridge as one of its founders, Lucas Myers, lived at the rectory of that church.

A second edition was published in 2006. A copy of the original journal was stored in the British Library in 2010.

Contributors

Along with  Hughes, the other listed contributors are : David Ross, Daniel Huws, Daniel Weissbort, Lucas Myers, Nathaniel Minton and George Weissbort.

References

External links
 Full Overview
 'British Library Archive throws light on Hughes and Plath', guardian.co.uk
 Stored back-up version

1956 establishments in the United Kingdom
1956 disestablishments in the United Kingdom
Student magazines published in the United Kingdom
Defunct literary magazines published in the United Kingdom
Magazines established in 1956
Magazines disestablished in 1956
Publications associated with the University of Cambridge
Poetry literary magazines